The 2005 Jeux de la Francophonie, also known as Ves Jeux de la Francophonie, (French for Francophone Games) were held from December 7–17, 2005 in Niamey, Niger.

Events

Sports

Cultural

Medal count

Total

Participation
There were a total of 1287 participants from 44 states and governments at the 2005 Games.
 Key
 Nation (number of participants)

External links
 Medal winners 2005 at jeux.francophonie.org 
 Medal tables at jeux.francophonie.org 

 
Jeux de la Francophonie
Jeux de la Francophonie
Sport in Niger
Jeux de la Francophonie
Multi-sport events in Niger